Senator Walsh may refer to:

Members of the United States Senate
Arthur Walsh (U.S. senator) (1896–1947), U.S. Senator from New Jersey from 1943 to 1944
David I. Walsh (1872–1947), U.S. Senator from Massachusetts from 1926 to 1947
John Walsh (Montana politician) (born 1960), U.S. Senator from Montana from 2014 to 2015
Patrick Walsh (Southern U.S. politician) (1840–1899), U.S. Senator from Georgia from 1894 to 1895
Thomas J. Walsh (1859–1933), U.S. Senator from Montana from 1913 to 1933

United States state senate members
Jack Walsh (politician) (fl. 2010s), Delaware State Senate
John Jackson Walsh (1871–1949), Massachusetts State Senate
John M. Walsh (born 1940), Iowa State Senate
Lawrence M. Walsh Sr. (born 1948), Illinois State Senate
Marian Walsh (born 1954), Massachusetts State Senate
Patrick Walsh (Michigan politician) (1892–1978), Michigan State Senate
Patrick Walsh (Wisconsin politician) (1830–1888), Wisconsin State Senate
R. Jay Walsh (1854–1916), Connecticut State Senate
Richard A. Walsh (1930–2005), Illinois State Senate
Thomas J. Walsh (New York politician) (1892–1955), New York State Senate
William E. Walsh (Oregon politician) (1903–1975), Oregon State Senate